Adamovsky or Adamovskiy (masculine), Adamovskaya (feminine) is a Russian and Ukrainian languages surname. Its Polish counterpart is Adamowski. 
Adamovský (masculine), Adamovská (feminine) is a Czech surname. All these surnames are derived from any of locations called Adamovo, Adamowo, Adamov, Adamów, etc., and literally mean "of/from Adamovo", etc. The place names themselves mean "Adam's". 

Notable people with these surnames include:
 Andrey Adamovskiy (born 1962), Ukrainian businessman and philanthropist
 (1857–1938) Czechoslovak politician and statesman
 Ezequiel Adamovsky (born 1971), Argentine historian and political activist
Zlata Adamovská (born 1959), Czech actress

See also
 

Czech-language surnames
Russian-language surnames
Ukrainian-language surnames